East Moreton was an electoral district of the Legislative Assembly in the Australian state of New South Wales created for the July 1859 election, partly replacing Stanley County in the Moreton Bay region around Brisbane. It was abolished in December 1859, as a result of the Separation of Queensland.

Members for East Moreton

Election results

Elections in the 1850s

1859

References

Former electoral districts of New South Wales
Electoral districts of New South Wales in the area of Queensland
History of Queensland
1859 establishments in Australia
1859 disestablishments in Australia
Constituencies established in 1859
Constituencies disestablished in 1859